Livia Țicanu (born 4 August 1964) is a retired Romanian rower. Competing in the women's eight, she won three medals between 1985 and 1987 at World Rowing Championships.

References 

 

1964 births
Living people
Romanian female rowers
World Rowing Championships medalists for Romania
Place of birth missing (living people)